Acacia longiphyllodinea, commonly known as yalgoo or long-leaved wattle, is a shrub belonging to the genus Acacia and the subgenus Juliflorae that is endemic to parts of western Australia

Description
It has an open and wiry habit wit numerous glabrous stems. More mature specimens have dark grey bark that is fissured at the base. The brown branchlets are covered in white powdery substance and are slightly flattened towards the apices. It flowers from July to September producing yellow flowers.

Distribution
It is native to the Mid West and Wheatbelt regions of Western Australia where it is found on undulating plains and among granite outcrops growing in sandy or loamy gravel soils. It occupies an area from around Geraldton in the north to Yalgoo in the east and south to around Bencubbin and is usually associated with low Eucalyptus woodland communities.

See also
List of Acacia species

References

longiphyllodinea
Acacias of Western Australia
Plants described in 1917
Taxa named by Joseph Maiden